The 2023 South American U-17 Championship will be an international football tournament to be held in Ecuador from 30 March to 23 April 2023. The ten national teams involved in the tournament were required to register a squad of a minimum of 19 and a maximum of 23 players, including at least three goalkeepers (Regulations Article 49). Only players in these squads are eligible to take part in the tournament. The tournament exclusively requires players to be born between 1 January 2006 and 31 December 2008 to be eligible, that is, they must be a maximun of 17 years old and at least 15 years old (Regulations Article 46).

Each national team had to register its list of up to 23 players in the COMET system and then submit it to CONMEBOL by 9 March 2023, 18:00 PYST (UTC−3) (Regulations Articles 49 and 50). Teams are only permitted to make player replacements in cases of serious injuries up to 48 hours before the start of the tournament (Regulations Article 57). Teams are also permitted to replace an injured goalkeeper with another at any time during the tournament (Regulations Article 58). In addition, any player with positive PCR tests for SARS-CoV-2 may be replaced at any moment before and during the tournament (Regulations Article 60). All the substitutions must have the approval of the CONMEBOL Medical Commission.

The age listed for each player is as of 30 March 2023, the first day of the tournament. A flag is included for coaches who are of a different nationality than their own national team.

Group A

Ecuador
Ecuador announced their squad of 23 players on 15 March 2023.

Head coach: Diego Martínez

Chile
Chile announced their squad of 23 players on 16 March 2023.

Head coach:  Hernán Caputto

Uruguay
Uruguay announced their squad of 23 players on 8 March 2023.

Head coach: Diego Demarco

Brazil
Brazil announced their squad of 23 players on 8 March 2023.

Head coach: Phelipe Leal

Colombia
Colombia announced their squad of 23 players on 16 March 2023.

Head coach: Juan Carlos Ramírez

Group B

Argentina
Argentina announced their squad of 23 players on 20 March 2023.

Head coach: Diego Placente

Paraguay
Paraguay announced their squad of 23 players on 14 March 2023.

Head coach: Aldo Bobadilla

Peru
Head coach: Pablo Zegarra

Venezuela
Venezuela announced their squad of 23 players on 15 March 2023.

Head coach:  Ricardo Valiño

Bolivia
Head coach: Pablo Escobar

References

South American Under-17 Football Championship squads